Do You Know Squarepusher is the sixth studio album by Squarepusher, released on Warp in 2002. It peaked at number 35 on the UK Independent Albums Chart. It includes a cover of Joy Division's "Love Will Tear Us Apart". The CD version of the album comes with an additional disc of live recordings, titled Alive in Japan.

Track listing

Charts

References

External links
 Do You Know Squarepusher at Warp
 
 

2002 live albums
Squarepusher albums
Warp (record label) albums